Rik de Voest and Izak van der Merwe were the defending champions but de Voest decided not to participate.
van der Merwe played alongside Jean Andersen and lost in the final to Devin Britton and Austin Krajicek 3–6, 3–6.

Seeds

Draw

Draw

References
 Main Draw

JSM Challenger of Champaign-Urbana - Doubles
2012 Doubles